Derrick Jerome Ham (born March 23, 1975) is a former American football defensive end in the National Football League for the Washington Redskins and the Cleveland Browns. He played college football at the University of Miami.

1975 births
Living people
People from Merritt Island, Florida
American football defensive ends
Miami Hurricanes football players
Washington Redskins players
Rhein Fire players
Cleveland Browns players